Dao Yi Bing Noodle Concern is a chain of noodle kiosks around Ningxia, China. The kiosk sells a variety of noodle types particular to Ningxia Hui Autonomous Region and provides a resourceful street food to the residents of the said province. The noodle concern has 35 kiosks across Ningxia and its surrounding regions and receives prefecture-level subsidies.

The corporate logo refers to a stylized Chinaman's skull with a conical hat sporting a Fu Manchu mustache. Next to the mascot, the letters '龘䲜靐' are sported, literally meaning 'Dá yè bìng' in Pinyin. This corresponds to the anglicization of the company name; Dao Yi Bing Noodle Concern.

References

Chinese noodles